The 2011-12 Qatari League, also known as Qatari Stars League was the 39th edition of top-level football championship in Qatar. The season started on 1 September 2011 and finished on 13 April 2012. Lekhwiya won the league title.

Teams
Al-Sailiya were relegated to the second-level league after finishing bottom in the 2010–11 Qatar Stars League campaign.

El Jaish were promoted as the 2nd level champions.

Stadia and locations

Personnel and kits
Note: Flags indicate national team as has been defined under FIFA eligibility rules. Players may hold more than one non-FIFA nationality.

Managerial changes

League table

Relegation playoff

Fixtures and results

Statistics

Top Goalscorers
As of April 13, 2012

Top Assistants
As of April 13, 2012

Disciplinary statistics
As of April 13, 2012
Yellow card = 1 point
Red card = 3 points

See also 
 List of Qatari football transfers winter 2011–12
 2011-12 Qatar 2nd Division
 2011 Sheikh Jassem Cup
 2012 Emir of Qatar Cup
 2012 Qatar Crown Prince Cup

References

External links
 Qatar Stars League 2011-2012

Football in Qatar
Qatar Stars League
Stars League